Ekaterina Aleksandrovna Kosova (born  25 April 1996) is a Russian snowboarder. She competed in the 2022 Winter Olympics, in  Women's big air.

She competed at the  2021–22 FIS Snowboard World Cup.

References

External links 

 Ekaterina Kosova Photos  - Getty Images

1996 births
Russian female snowboarders
Living people
Sportspeople from Moscow
Snowboarders at the 2022 Winter Olympics
Olympic snowboarders of Russia